Vino Zhimomi (born 11 October 1995) is an Indian cricketer. He made his first-class debut on 25 December 2019, for Nagaland in the 2019–20 Ranji Trophy.

References

External links
 

1995 births
Living people
Indian cricketers
Nagaland cricketers